Foot gymnastics are games and exercises intended to strengthen the muscles of legs and feet, improve the motion sequences of walking and sports, support therapy of varicose veins and dorsal pain. Such activities are recommended to improve flat feet especially of children and the gait performance of older adults.

References

External links
 Foot Gymnastic Games

Gymnastics
foot